Su'a Aloese (died January 1982) was a Western Samoan politician. He was a member of the Legislative Assembly from 1967 to 1973.

Biography
Following his education at Malifa school, Aloese began working as a trader in 1932. In 1956 he became a civil servant, joining the Agriculture Department.

After leaving the civil service in 1966, he contested the Fa'asaleleaga No. 3 constituency in the 1967 elections, defeating incumbent MP Toleafoa Talitimu. After becoming an MP, he sat on the Bills Committee. He was re-elected in 1970, but lost to Talitimu in 1973. He contested the seat again in 1979, but finished fifth in a field of six candidates.

He died in April in January 1982 at the age of 72.

References

20th-century Samoan businesspeople
Samoan civil servants
Members of the Legislative Assembly of Samoa
1982 deaths